The Colour of Your Lips is a Canadian short drama film, directed by Annick Blanc and released in 2018. The film stars Alexis Lefebvre and Katia Lévesque as a man and a woman who appear to be the last remaining survivors of a post-apocalyptic world where the atmosphere no longer supports human life.

At the 7th Canadian Screen Awards in 2019, the film was shortlisted for Best Live Action Short Drama.

References

External links 
 

2018 short films
2018 drama films
2018 films
Canadian drama short films
2010s Canadian films